Rimell is a surname. Notable people with the surname include:

 Anthony Rimell (1928–2007), English first-class cricketer
 Fred Rimell (1913–1981), British National Hunt racing jockey and horse trainer
 Victoria Rimell (born 1974), British classicist and professor